Birds described in 1853 include white-thighed swallow, black oropendola, black-breasted barbet,  butterfly coquette, carunculated caracara, Fraser's eagle-owl, oriole whistler, ornate flycatcher, Philippine megapode, three-wattled bellbird, yellow-breasted racket-tail

Events
Death of Hugh Edwin Strickland , Émile Deville

Publications
John Cassin  Illustrations of the Birds of California, Texas, Oregon, British and Russian America (1853–56)
Gustav Hartlaub and Jean Cabanis, found the Journal für Ornithologie
Johann Wilhelm von Müller begins  (1853-1870)
Charles John Andersson reaches Lake Ngami
Emmanuel Le Maout publishes .
Jean-Baptiste Bailly begins publishing an Ornithology of Savoy (1853-1854)
Charles Lucien Bonaparte 1853. Notes sur les collections rapportées en 1853, par M. A. Delattre, de son voyage en Californie et dans le Nicaragua. Compte Rendu des Séances de l'Académie des Sciences. Mallet-Bachelier. Paris.online  BHL

Jules Bourcier, 1853 Nouvelle espèces du genre Metallura, Gould. Revue et magasin de zoologie pure et appliquée (= 2). Band 5, 1853, S. 295–296 online BHL

Ongoing events
John Gould The birds of Australia; Supplement 1851–69. 1 vol. 81 plates; Artists: J. Gould and H. C. Richter; Lithographer: H. C. Richter
John Gould The birds of Asia; 1850-83 7 vols. 530 plates, Artists: J. Gould, H. C. Richter, W. Hart and J. Wolf; Lithographers:H. C. Richter and W. Hart

References

Bird
Birding and ornithology by year
B